The 2000 World Rowing Championships were World Rowing Championships that were held from 1 to 6 August 2000 in conjunction with the World Junior Rowing Championships in Zagreb, Croatia. Since 2000 was an Olympic year for rowing, the World Championships did not include Olympic events scheduled for the 2000 Summer Olympics.

Medal summary

Men's events

Women's events

Medal table

References

World Rowing Championships
W
W
W
Rowing
Rowing competitions in Croatia
August 2000 sports events in Europe
2000s in Zagreb